Dhoapatta is a Maldivian romantic drama television series developed for Television Maldives by Abdul Faththaah. The series stars Jamsheedha Ahmed, Mohamed Shavin, Sheela Najeeb and Niuma Mohamed in pivotal roles.

Premise
Ruqiyya (Haajara Abdul Kareem), a gluttonous woman and a local medicine practitioner forces her step-daughter, Aminath (Sheela Najeeb) to marry a wealthy old businessman, Gadhir. Fayaz (Mohamed Shavin) visits Ha. Kelaa for medication from Ruqiyya where he meets Aminath and her childhood friend Nasiha (Jamsheedha Ahmed). Nasiha is attracted to Fayaz though she is in a serious relationship with a short-tempered dominant man, Shahid (Ashraf Numaan) while Aminath shows interest in Fayaz too. Fayaz proposes to Nasiha and reveals his intention to Aminath, breaking her heart. Nasiha keeps flirting with Fayaz only to prove her "capability" and to "win a bet", despite loving Shahid more than Fayaz. However, as they start spending more time together, Nasiha realizes that it is Fayaz who can enlighten her future with contentment. Failed in love, Aminath agrees to marry Gadhir and leaves with him.

Cast and characters

Main
 Jamsheedha Ahmed as Nasiha
 Mohamed Shavin as Fayaz Adam
 Sheela Najeeb as Aminath
 Niuma Mohamed as Mary

Recurring
 Haajara Abdul Kareem as Ruqiyya; Aminath's step-mother
 Mariyam Shakeela as Nasiha's sister
 Neena Saleem as Faathun; Nasiha's friend
 Ashraf Numaan as Shahid
 Koyya Hassan Manik as Adam; Fayaz's father
 Aminath Rasheedha as Mary's mother
 Arifa Ibrahim as Nasiha's sister
 Hussain Zaki as Junaid

Guest
 Hassan Yoosuf
 Fauziyya Hassan as Fayaz's mother

Soundtrack

References

Serial drama television series
Maldivian television shows